Glazoué is a town, arrondissement, and commune in the Collines Department of central Benin. It is located on the railway line from Cotonou to Parakou. The commune covers an area of 1350 square kilometres and as of 2013 had a population of 124,431 people.

References

Communes of Benin
Populated places in the Collines Department